Shadows, the fifth album by the Yorkshire-based folk music duo O'Hooley & Tidow, was released on 29 July 2016 on the No Masters label.

Reception
In a five-starred review for The Guardian, Robin Denselow said that O'Hooley & Tidow "sing together with the ease of a married couple, matching delicate and increasingly brave harmony vocals against O’Hooley’s thoughtful piano work. And they are exceptional songwriters, as they prove with this unusual set". In a four-starred review for Mojo, Colin Irwin said that "the overriding tone of this album is as deep and subtly dramatic as the piano instrumental that gives the long-player its title".

Track listing
 "Colne Valley Hearts" (O'Hooley/Tidow) (3.40)
 "Made in England" (O'Hooley/Tidow) (3.40)
 "Blanket" (O'Hooley/Tidow) (4.54)
 "The Needle & the Hand" (O'Hooley/Tidow) (4.46)
 "Small, Big Love" (Kathryn Williams/Graham Hardy) (3.30)
 "Shadows" (Belinda O'Hooley) (4.14)
 "Beryl" (O'Hooley/Tidow) (3.45)
 "The Pixie" (O'Hooley/Tidow) (4.53)
 "Reapers" (O'Hooley/Tidow) (4.58)
 "The Dark Rolling Sea" (O'Hooley/Tidow) (2.36)
 "River" (Joni Mitchell) (3.56)

Songs
The album includes a song, "Small, Big Love", which Kathryn Williams presented to Belinda O'Hooley and Heidi Tidow at their wedding.

Personnel

O'Hooley & Tidow
 Belinda O'Hooley – vocals, piano, programming, accordion
 Heidi Tidow – vocals, percussion

Other musicians
 Jude Abbott – trumpet, flugelhorn
 Hazel Askew – backing vocals
 Pete Flood – drums, percussion
 Hannah James – backing vocals
 Grace Petrie – vocals, backing vocals
 Rowan Rheingans – fiddle, viola, backing vocals
 Andy Seward – double bass
 Michele Stodart – electric bass, electric guitar, EBow
 Ben Stone – tattoo needle

Production
The album was mixed by Neil Ferguson and mastered by Denis Blackham at Skye Mastering.The album cover was designed by Martin Roswell, incorporating photographs by Maisy Carr Photography; the sleeve notes were by Heidi Tidow.

References

External links
 Official website: O'Hooley & Tidow

2016 albums
O'Hooley & Tidow albums